The 1865 United Kingdom general election in Ireland took place in July 1865. It was the first election contested by the new Liberal Party. In Ireland, the Liberals increased their seat total. This composed the greater part of the increase of 13 seats for the Liberals led by Viscount Palmerston in the United Kingdom election as a whole, after which they stayed in office. Palmerston died later that year and was succeeded as prime minister by Earl Russell.

Results

The vote total does not include the result from Dublin University

See also
 History of Ireland (1801–1923)

1865
Ireland
July 1865 events